The VCU Rams men's basketball team represents Virginia Commonwealth University in National Collegiate Athletic Association Division I men's basketball competitions. This article is a list of results and statistics of the men's basketball team from the 1979–80 season to the 1990–91 season during which the team played in the Sun Belt Conference.



1979–80

1980–81

1981–82

1982–83

1983–84

1984–85

1985–86

1986–87

1987–88

1988–89

1989–90

1990–91

NBA Draft selections

References 

1979-91